Group D of the 2011 FIFA Women's World Cup consisted of the teams from Brazil, Australia, Norway and Equatorial Guinea. The games were played on 29 June, 3 July and 6 July 2011. The top two teams advanced to the knockout stage.

Standings

Matches

Norway vs Equatorial Guinea

Brazil vs Australia

Australia vs Equatorial Guinea

Brazil vs Norway

Equatorial Guinea vs Brazil

Australia vs Norway

References

External links
Group D on fifa.com

Group DB
Group
Group
Group
Youth